Broke Sky is a 2007 neo-noir 35 millimeter film, and the directorial debut of cinematographer Thomas L. Callaway. The film stars Will Wallace, Joe Unger, Bruce Glover, Duane Whitaker and Barbara Chisholm, and has earned comparisons to the work of the Coen Brothers.

Plot
Bucky and Earl are the two man team that collect and dispose of road kill for the county. A new, specially designed carcass removal truck forces them to choose which one of them gets to keep his job and who is let go. Earl comes up with a plan so they can both keep their jobs, but it means working at night. One night they are called out to Rufus's house where there is something dead in the well that needs to be removed. When Earl and Bucky discover what is fouling the well, their shock and confusion turns to panic and fear as they figure out what to do. Disagreement and conflict arise between them and this gradually builds to mistrust, suspicion and mystery, revealing secrets of a dirty, vile, inconceivable past. A past as repulsive as the road kill they scoop off the road.

Production

Broke Sky was shot on location in Waco, Texas.

Featured cast

Awards
Dances With Films 2007: Won, Grand Jury Award
Memphis Indie Film Festival 2007: Won, Best Narrative Feature
Idyllwild International Festival of Cinema (IIFC) 2010: Won, Best Cinematography

References

External links
Variety.com
Laweekly.com
Official website

2007 films
American neo-noir films
2000s English-language films
2000s American films